Sternotomis itzingeri is a species of flat-faced longhorn beetles belonging to the family Cerambycidae.

Description
The colors and markings of these longhorn beetles are variable. The background is usually pale greyish blue, with white markings, but coloration may also be dark blue, dark green or completely brown, while marks may be light ochreous. Scutellum may be green or yellow.

Distribution
This species can be found in Uganda, Kenya, Sudan, Democratic Republic of Congo, Tanzania and Zaire.

References
 Biolib
 Vincent ALLARD  THE BEETLES OF THE WORLD
 Lamiaires du Monde
 IRD

Sternotomini
Beetles described in 1935